Banksia lanata is a species of shrub that is endemic to a restricted area of Western Australia. It has linear leaves, pale cream-coloured flowers in a head with whitish bracts at the base and later up to fifty elliptical follicles in each head.

Description
Up to fifty follicles form in each head and remain closed until the plant is killed by fire.

Taxonomy and naming
Banksia lanata was first formally described in 1981 by Alex George in the journal Nuytsia from specimens he collected east of Eneabba in 1971. The specific epithet (lanata) is a Latin word meaning "woolly", referring to the hairs on the bracts.

Distribution and habitat
This banksia is restricted to an area between Arrowsmith Lake, Coomallo Creek and Tathra National Park in the Geraldton Sandplains biogeographic region where it is relatively common.

Conservation status
Banksia lanata is classified as "not threatened" by the Western Australian Government Department of Parks and Wildlife.

References

lanata
Eudicots of Western Australia
Plants described in 1981
Taxa named by Alex George